Walter Preston (1819–1867) was a prominent Confederate politician. He was born in Washington County, Virginia. He represented the state in the Provisional Confederate Congress and the First Confederate Congress.

External links
 The Political Graveyard

1819 births
1867 deaths
Deputies and delegates to the Provisional Congress of the Confederate States
Members of the Confederate House of Representatives from Virginia
19th-century American politicians
People from Washington County, Virginia